is a town located in Itano District, Tokushima Prefecture, Japan. , the town had an estimated population of 14,770 in 6794 households and a population density of 1000 persons per km². Matsushige is the location of Tokushima Airport, from where domestic flights depart for various other Japanese cities. The town also hosts a Japan Maritime Self-Defense Force base.

Geography 
Matsushige is located between Tokushima and Naruto cities, facing the Kii Channel to the east side. It is situated on the delta of the Yoshino River.

Neighbouring municipalities 
Tokushima Prefecture
Tokushima
Naruto
Kitajima

Climate
Matsushige has a Humid subtropical climate (Köppen Cfa) characterized by warm summers and cool winters with light snowfall.  The average annual temperature in Matsushige is 16.2 °C. The average annual rainfall is 1637 mm with September as the wettest month. The temperatures are highest on average in August, at around 26.7 °C, and lowest in January, at around 6.3 °C.

Demographics
Per Japanese census data, the population of Matsushige has been growing steadily since the 1940s.

History 
As with all of Tokushima Prefecture, the area of Matsushige was part of ancient Awa Province. It was noted for ocean-borne shipping, especially of timber, from Tosa Province to the Kinai region . During the Edo period, the area was part of the holdings of Tokushima Domain ruled by the Hachisuka clan from their seat at Tokushima Castle. The village of Matsushige was established within Itano District, Tokushima with the creation of the modern municipalities system on October 1, 1889. It was raised to town status on August 1, 1961.

Government
Matsushige has a mayor-council form of government with a directly elected mayor and a unicameral town council of 12 members. Matsushige, together with the other municipalities of Itano District, contributes four members to the Tokushima Prefectural Assembly.  In terms of national politics, the town is part of Tokushima 2nd district of the lower house of the Diet of Japan.

The JMSDF Air Training Group Tokushima and the JGSDF 14th Aviation Unit are located in Matsushige.

Economy
Matsushige has a mixed economy based on agriculture, commercial fishing and light manufacturing.

Education
Matsushige has three public elementary schools and one public middle school operated by the town government. The town does not have a high school.

Transportation

Airports
Tokushima Airport

Railway
Matsushige has no passenger railway service. The closest stations are Kyokaimae Station and Kompiramae Station on the JR Shikoku Naruto Line; however, Tokushima Station is often used for convenience.

Highways 
  Tokushima Expressway

Sister city relations
 - Mount Vernon, Washington, United States

References

External links

Matsushige official website 

Towns in Tokushima Prefecture
Populated coastal places in Japan